Fouzan, also spelled Fawzan, Fowzan, and Fauzan, is an Arabic name meaning "successful", "success", "victorious", or "victor".  The root word is "fouz", and the tense is symbolized by the "an".  In the Arabic language, there is a single and plural tense, as well as a dual tense.  The suffix, "an", represents the dual tense of a word.  Therefore, the true meaning of "Fouzan" is a dual success.

The term is derived from the Arabic Qur'an, in which it appears multiple times in the form of Fouzan-Azeema, which means "Great Success" or "The Highest Achievement" and is always used in the context of the description of the everlasting eternal success which is a result of the individual who remains dedicated to God, and attains paradise for himself. And it is the name of success

Arabic masculine given names